The 1907 Jarrow by-election was held on 4 July 1907.

Vacancy
The by-election was held due to the death of the incumbent Liberal MP, Charles Palmer.

Electoral history
At the 1906 general election Palmer had had a straight fight with Labour;

Candidates
The sitting Liberal MP, the 84-year-old Sir Charles Palmer, had announced that he did not intend to stand for Parliament at the next election and the local Liberals had already selected Spencer Leigh Hughes as his replacement. Hughes’ opportunity to get into Parliament came quickly as Sir Charles died on 4 June 1907 thus causing a by-election at which Hughes was adopted as Liberal candidate. Hughes faced, Labour, Conservative  and Irish Parliamentary Party opponents.

Result

Aftermath
For Curran, it was a short-lived triumph as he was unseated by another Liberal at the following General Election in January 1910. Rose-Innes did not stand for Parliament again. In 1909 Hughes was the unsuccessful Liberal candidate at the 1909 Bermondsey by-election. The Irish Nationalists never again ran a candidate in Jarrow.

External links

References

1907 elections in the United Kingdom
1907 in England
By-elections to the Parliament of the United Kingdom in County Durham constituencies
Elections in Tyne and Wear
20th century in County Durham
Jarrow